Yancun Town is a town situated in eastern portion of Fangshan District, Beijing, China. It borders Xinzhen Subdistrict and Qinglonghu Town in its north, Xilu, Gongchen Subdistricts and Liangxiang Town in its east, Doudian Town in the south, Chengguan Subdistrict in the west, and contains Xingcheng Subdistrict as well as an exclave of Xinzhen Subdistrict within. It is home to 77,621 residents as of 2020. 

The name came to be during the reign of Yongle Emperor of Ming dynasty. At the time eight families with the surname Yan moved here from Zhuozhou, and thus the settlement was known as Yancun.

History

Administrative Divisions 

In 2021, there were 30 subdivisions within Yancun Town, including 8 communities and 22 villages:

See also 
 List of township-level divisions of Beijing

References 

Fangshan District
Towns in Beijing